Thomas King Butt is an American politician and architect serving as the sixth mayor of Richmond, California. He was vice-mayor in 2002 and 2012 and a member of the Richmond City Council for over 20 years before being elected mayor. He is the longest continuously serving council member in Richmond's history.

Early life and education 
Butt was born in Albuquerque, New Mexico and raised in Fayetteville, Arkansas. His father, Thomas F. Butt, served in the United States Army during World War II and later became a judge in Arkansas. Butt's mother was a librarian in the Fayetteville Public Library. Butt earned a Bachelor of Arts and Bachelor of Architecture from the University of Arkansas, followed by a Master of Architecture from the University of California, Los Angeles.

Career
As an undergraduate, Butt spent summers working for the United States Forest Service in Montana, Hawaii, and San Francisco. Butt joined the United States Army Corps of Engineers in 1966 and was deployed to Vietnam shortly after. He served until 1970. After leaving the Army, Butt married his wife, Shirley, in 1971. They lived in Marin County, California before moving to Richmond in 1973.

Butt  is the president of Interactive Resources, a local architectural firm. He is also a contractor and former real estate broker. Butt founded and is the president of the East Brother Light Station, Inc., a non-profit organization focused on maintaining the historic East Brother Island Lighthouse on East Brother Island, a Bay Area landmark on the National Register of Historic Places. Butt founded and remains a board member of Rosie the Riveter Trust (named for  Rosie the Riveter), the non-profit partner of Rosie the Riveter World War II Home Front National Historical Park located in Richmond.

Politics 
He won the Richmond mayoral election of 2014 and succeeded Gayle McLaughlin as mayor. He was sworn in by Lieutenant Governor Gavin Newsom on Tuesday, January 13, 2015. His relationships with other city leaders deteriorated over time, and in 2021, he said "I’m pretty much a lame duck" and indicated that he would exit political life.

References

External links
 Tom Butt official site
 Interactive Resources
 Tom Butt city of Richmond profile
 SmartVoter Tom Butt profile

Living people
Activists from the San Francisco Bay Area
Richmond City Council members (California)
Architects from California
Mayors of Richmond, California
21st-century American politicians
1944 births

University of Arkansas alumni
University of California, Los Angeles alumni
People from Fayetteville, Arkansas